Andres Miguel Salazar Marcano Airport  is an airport serving Isla de Coche, an island in the Venezuelan state of Nueva Esparta.

The airport has been under the regional administration of the state of Nueva Esparta since 1992. For years it remained abandoned until 2006, when a major renovation began which included the extension of the runway.

Facilities

Airlines and destinations

See also
Transport in Venezuela
List of airports in Venezuela

References

External links
OurAirports - Isla de Coche
OpenStreetMap - Isla de Coche

Airports in Venezuela
Buildings and structures in Nueva Esparta